Siege of Metz may refer to:

War of Metz, 1324
Siege of Metz (1552), by the Spanish during the Italian War of 1551–59
Siege of Metz (1814), by the Prussians and Russians during the War of the Sixth Coalition
Siege of Metz (1870), by the Prussians during the Franco-Prussian War

See also
Battle of Metz